The Doll Queen (German: Die Puppenkönigin) is a 1925 German silent comedy film directed by Gennaro Righelli and starring Maria Jacobini, Harry Liedtke, Viggo Larsen. It was shot at the Grunewald Studios in Berlin. The film's sets were designed by the art director István Szirontai Lhotka.

Cast
 Maria Jacobini as Jeannine Armelle 
 Harry Liedtke as Comte Claude du Plessis 
 Viggo Larsen
 Margarete Kupfer
 Hans Wassmann
 Erra Bognar
 Hugo Döblin
 Ida Wüst

References

Bibliography
Hans-Michael Bock and Tim Bergfelder. The Concise Cinegraph: An Encyclopedia of German Cinema. Berghahn Books, 2009.

External links

1925 films
Films of the Weimar Republic
Films directed by Gennaro Righelli
German silent feature films
1925 comedy films
German comedy films
Silent comedy films
1920s German films
1920s German-language films